Sorum is an unincorporated community in Perkins County, in the U.S. state of South Dakota.

History
Sorum was laid out in 1908, and named in honor of Chris Sorum, a local merchant. A post office called Sorum was established in 1910, and remained in operation until 1963. At one point, the town had a newspaper,  The Sorum Journal,  which ran at least in January 1911. Rabbit Creek runs through the community.

References

Unincorporated communities in Perkins County, South Dakota
Unincorporated communities in South Dakota